Yana Urqu (Quechua yana black, urqu mountain, "black mountain", hispanicized spelling Yana Orjo) is a mountain in the Chunta mountain range in the Andes of Peru, about  high. It is located in the Huancavelica Region, Huancavelica Province, Huacocolpa District. Yana Urqu lies northwest of Inqhana and northeast of Wayra Q'asa.

References

Mountains of Huancavelica Region
Mountains of Peru